Macromphalina is a genus of very small sea snails, marine gastropod mollusks in the family Vanikoridae.

Species

Species within the genus Macromphalina include:
 Macromphalina alfredensis (Bartsch, 1915)
 Macromphalina apexplanum Rolan & Rubio, 1998
 Macromphalina argentea (Bartsch, 1918)
 Macromphalina argentina Castellanos, 1975
 Macromphalina bouryi (Dautzenberg, 1912)
 Macromphalina canarreos Rolan & Rubio, 1998
 Macromphalina cryptophila (Carpenter, 1857)
 Macromphalina dautzenbergi Adam & Knudsen
 Macromphalina diazmerlanoi Rolan & Rubio, 1998
 Macromphalina dipsycha (Pilsbry & Olsson, 1945)
 Macromphalina equatorialis (Pilsbry & Olsson, 1945)
 Macromphalina floridana Moore, 1965
 Macromphalina garcesi Rolan & Rubio, 1998
 Macromphalina gofasi Rubio & Rolán, 1994
 Macromphalina hancocki (Strong & Hertlein, 1939)
 Macromphalina harryleei Rolan & Rubio, 1998
 Macromphalina hypernotia Pilsbry & Olsson, 1952
 Macromphalina immersiceps (Pilsbry & Olsson, 1945)
 Macromphalina jibacoa Rolán & Rubio, 1998
 Macromphalina lyrapintoae Barros, 1994
 Macromphalina palmalitoris Pilsbry & McGinty, 1950
 Macromphalina panamensis (Bartsch, 1918)
 Macromphalina paradoxa Rolan & Rubio, 1998
 Macromphalina peruvianus (Pilsbry & Olsson, 1945)
 Macromphalina philippii (Pilsbry & Olsson, 1945)
 Macromphalina pierrot Gardner, 1948
 Macromphalina recticeps (Pilsbry & Olsson, 1945)
 Macromphalina redferni Rolan & Rubio, 1998
 Macromphalina robertsoni Rolan & Rubio, 1998
 Macromphalina scabra (Philippi, 1849)
 Macromphalina souverbiei (de Folin, 1867)
 Macromphalina susoi Rolán & Rubio, 1998
 Macromphalina symmetrica (Pilsbry & Olsson, 1945)
 Macromphalina thompsoni Rolan & Rubio, 1998
 Macromphalina worsfoldi Rolan & Rubio, 1998
Taxon inquirendum
 Macromphalina lacuniformis (R. B. Watson, 1886)
Species brought into synonymy
 Macromphalina californica Dall, 1903: synonym of Megalomphalus californicus (Dall, 1903) (original combination)
 Macromphalina lozoueti (a MS name that appears on some websites)
 Macromphalina peruvianus [sic]: synonym of Macromphalina peruviana (Pilsbry & Olsson, 1945) (incorrect gender ending)

References

 Gofas, S.; Afonso, J.P.; Brandào, M. (Ed.). (S.a.). Conchas e Moluscos de Angola = Coquillages et Mollusques d'Angola. [Shells and molluscs of Angola]. Universidade Agostinho / Elf Aquitaine Angola: Angola. 140 pp.

Vanikoridae